The Douglas Water is a river in Argyll in the southwest Scottish Highlands. It emerges from the northeastern end of the diminutive Loch Dubh-ghlas  and flows northeastwards through Coire Dubh-ghlas, before turning east then southeast amongst extensive conifer plantations to the bridge which carries the A83 road over it. It then turns east at this point and flows into the tidal Loch Fyne

References 

Rivers of Argyll and Bute